Kamal Haasan is an Indian actor, director, producer, playback singer and lyricist working mainly for the Indian film industry.

Discography

Lyricist

See also 
 Kamal Haasan filmography
 List of awards and nominations received by Kamal Haasan

References

External links 
 

Discographies of Indian artists
Discography